Bátaszéki Sport Egyesület is a professional football club based in Bátaszék, Tolna County, Hungary. The club competes in the Tolna county league.

Name changes
1945–1949: Bátaszéki Vasutas SE
1949–1951: Bátaszéki Vasutas Sport Kör
1951–1955: Bátaszéki Lokomotív Sport Kör
1955–1957: Bátaszéki Törekvés
1957–1979: Bátaszéki Vasutas Sport Kör
1979–?: Bátaszéki Szövetkezeti Vasutas SE
?-?: Bátaszéki SE
1996–present: Bátaszék SE

External links
 Profile on Magyar Futball

References

Football clubs in Hungary
Association football clubs established in 1945
1945 establishments in Hungary